Gamla staden ("Old town") is a neighbourhood of Malmö, situated in the city district of Centrum, Malmö Municipality, Skåne County, Sweden.

References

Neighbourhoods of Malmö